James I. Nazworthy (September 3, 1926 - February 21, 1974) was an American Thoroughbred horse racing trainer.

Career 
Nazworthy began training horses at age twenty-one. Based in California, among his successful runners, he conditioned horses for owners such as Fannie Hertz, Travis Kerr, as well for his wife's Sledge Stable.

Death 
He died in 1974 of a heart attack at age forty-seven. The Los Angeles Times February 23, 1974 obituary called Nazworthy "one of California's foremost trainers."

A resident of Arcadia, California, he was survived by his wife, Maxine, a daughter of Sidney B. Factor, and their son, David.

References
 February 23, 1974 Los Angeles Times article titled Jim Nazworthy, Veteran Horse Trainer, Dies

1926 births
1974 deaths
American horse trainers
Sportspeople from California